Carwoola Parish is a parish of Murray County, a cadastral unit for use on land titles. It is located to the south of the Australian Capital Territory and to the south-east of Queanbeyan. The original northern and eastern boundary was the Molonglo River; this is still the boundary for most of the parish, except in the north, where the relatively small area north of the Queanbeyan-Goulburn railway line (at  ) was transferred to the ACT in 1909. The south-western boundary is the Queanbeyan River. Captain's Flat Road is the major road running through the parish. The area also roughly aligns with the locality of Carwoola.

References
 Map showing proposed Federal Capital Territory and tenures of land within same, Charles Robt. Scrivener, 22 May 1909
 
 NSW Dept. of Lands Parish map preservation project

Parishes of Murray County
Queanbeyan–Palerang Regional Council